The Turnbull-Ritter House (also known as the Sunrise Plantation) is a historic house located northwest of Lamont, Florida, off U.S. 19.

Description and history 
The -story Classical Revival style house was built around 1856. It was added to the National Register of Historic Places on July 18, 1979.

References

External links
 Jefferson County listings at National Register of Historic Places
 Jefferson County listings at Florida's Office of Cultural and Historical Programs

Houses on the National Register of Historic Places in Florida
National Register of Historic Places in Jefferson County, Florida
Houses in Jefferson County, Florida